Delias sanaca, the pale Jezebel, is a medium-sized butterfly of the family Pieridae. The species was first described by Frederic Moore in 1857.

See also
List of butterflies of India
List of butterflies of India (Pieridae)

References
 

sanaca
Butterflies of Asia
Butterflies of Indochina
Butterflies described in 1857